Tynanthus is a genus of woody plants that is part of  the Bignoniaceae family.

References

External links

Bignoniaceae
Bignoniaceae genera